Kgalagadi Transfrontier Park is a large wildlife preserve and conservation area in southern Africa.

The park straddles the border between South Africa and Botswana and comprises two adjoining national parks:
 Kalahari Gemsbok National Park in South Africa
 Gemsbok National Park in Botswana
Approximately three-quarters of the park lies in Botswana and one-quarter in South Africa. Kgalagadi means "place of thirst."
In December 2015, media reports claimed that rights for gas-fracking in more than half of the Botswana portion of the park had been sold. The Botswana government later refuted these reports.

Location and terrain
The park is located largely within the southern Kalahari Desert. The terrain consists of red sand dunes, sparse vegetation, occasional trees, and the dry riverbeds of the Nossob and Auob Rivers. The rivers are said to flow only about once per century. However, water flows underground and provides life for grass and Vachellia erioloba trees growing in the river beds. The rivers may flow briefly after large thunderstorms.

Wildlife
The park has abundant, varied wildlife. It is home to large mammalian predators such as lions, cheetahs, African leopards, and hyenas. Migratory herds of large herbivores such as blue wildebeest, springbok, eland, and red hartebeest also live and move seasonally within the park, providing sustenance for the predators. More than 200 species of bird can be found in the park, including vultures and raptors such as eagles, buzzards, and secretary birds.

Since 2005, the protected area is considered a Lion Conservation Unit and a lion stronghold in Southern Africa.

Weather
The weather in the Kalahari can reach extremes. Winter nights can be quite cold with temperatures below freezing. Precipitation is sparse in this desert area.

Facilities
Within the park there are three traditional tourist lodges, called "rest camps". These are fully serviced lodges and include amenities such as air conditioning, shops and swimming pools. There are also six wilderness camps in the park. The wilderness camps provide little more than shelter and wash water; visitors must supply their own food, drinking water and firewood.

Visitors 
During the year 1 April 2017 to 31 March 2018, the park received a total of 52,463 visitors up from 48,221 in the previous year.

History
The Kalahari Gemsbok National Park in South Africa was established on 31 July 1931 mainly to protect the migrating game, especially the gemsbok, from poaching. In 1948 an informal verbal agreement was made between the then Bechuanaland Protectorate and the Union of South Africa to set up a conservation area in the contiguous areas of the two lands. In June 1992 representatives from the South African National Parks Board (now SANParks) and the Department of Wildlife and National Parks of Botswana set up a joint management committee to manage the area as a single ecological unit. A management plan was drafted, reviewed, and approved in 1997. The parties agreed to cooperate in tourism and share equally in park entrance fees. On 7 April 1999, Botswana and South Africa signed a historic bilateral agreement whereby both countries undertook to manage their adjacent national parks, the Gemsbok National Park in Botswana and the Kalahari Gemsbok National Park in South Africa as a single ecological unit. The boundary between the two parks had no physical barriers, although it is also the international border between the two countries. This allowed for the free movement of animals. On 12 May 2000, President Festus Mogae of Botswana and President Thabo Mbeki of South Africa formally launched Southern Africa's first peace park, the Kgalagadi Transfrontier Park.

Cultural preservation and establishment of !Xaus Lodge
In October 2002, the governments set aside 580 km² (224 mi²) for the use of the native peoples, the Khomani San and Mier communities. This was divided between 277.69 km² of San Heritage Land and 301.34 km² of Mier Heritage Land. The South African National Parks (SANParks) manages the land under contract. This land was named the !Ae!Hai Heritage Park. The settlement agreement also provided for the communities to receive funds for the specific purpose of constructing a tourism facility. The lodge was named !Xaus Lodge (meaning 'heart' in the local language) and is managed commercially on behalf of the ‡Khomani San and Mier communities by Transfrontier Parks Destinations.

!Xaus Lodge's existence allows the cultural practices of the ‡Khomani San to continue in a few ways. The cultural village near the Lodge allows the local people to create and sell their crafts. This is both a way for them to emulate and remember the culture of historical ‡Khomani San, and a way for them to express the changes in that culture. The !Ae!Hai Heritage park has also been named the first International Dark Sky Sanctuary in Africa by the International Dark Sky Association.

Fracking
In December 2015, it was reported in the media that the government of Botswana quietly sold the rights to frack for shale gas in Kgalagadi Transfrontier Park. The sale was not reported at the time. In November 2015, the company changed its name to "Karoo Energy". In February 2016 Botswana's Ministry of Environment, Wildlife and Tourism refuted these reports saying "There are also no licenses for fracking in the KTP" and "no intention to issue any approvals for fracking in the KTP or any other national park or national game reserve anywhere in Botswana".

Gallery

See also
Gemsbok
Kalahari Desert

External links

 
South African National Parks website
Map of the park
Department of Environmental Affairs and Tourism website
Photography and Safari guide to the Kgalagadi Transfrontier Park
!Xaus Lodge - owned and run by the Khomani San and Mier communities

References

National parks of Botswana
Peace parks
Kalahari Desert
Protected areas established in 1931
National parks of South Africa
Protected areas of the Northern Cape